Cyanolanius is a bird genus placed in the Vangidae.

There are two species:
 Madagascar blue vanga, Cyanolanius madagascarinus
 Comoros blue vanga, Cyanolanius comorensis

References

Cyanolanius
Bird genera